David "Dai" M. Davies (c. 1915 – death unknown) was a Welsh professional rugby league footballer who played in the 1930s, 1940s and 1950s.

Playing career

International honours
Dai Davies won nine caps for Wales from 1939 to 1948 while at Salford.

Challenge Cup Final appearances
Dai Davies played right-, i.e. number 10, in Salford's 7-4 victory over Barrow in the 1938 Challenge Cup Final during the 1937–38 season at Wembley Stadium, London, in front of a crowd of 51,243.

County Cup Final appearances
About Dai Davies' time, there was Salford's 5-2 victory over Wigan in the 1936 Lancashire County Cup Final during the 1936–37 season at Wilderspool Stadium, Warrington on Saturday 17 October 1936, and played left-, i.e. number 8, in the 7-10 defeat by Wigan in the 1938 Lancashire County Cup Final during the 1938–39 season at Station Road, Swinton on Saturday 22 October 1938.

References

External links

1910s births
Place of birth missing
Place of death missing
Rugby league props
Rugby league second-rows
Salford Red Devils players
Wales national rugby league team players
Welsh rugby league players
Year of birth uncertain
Year of death missing